Qutb al-din Hasan (Persian: قطب الدین حسن) was the king of the Ghurid dynasty. He succeeded his father Muhammad ibn Abbas in 1080. Qutb inherited a kingdom which was in tribal chaos. He was killed while he was suppressing a revolt west of Ghazni, and was succeeded by his son Izz al-Din Husayn who restored peace to the kingdom.

References

Sources

 

12th-century Iranian people
11th-century Iranian people
Ghurid dynasty
1100 deaths
Year of birth unknown
11th-century rulers in Asia